Wladyslaw Nikiciuk (born 9 March 1940) is a Polish Olympic javelin thrower. He represented his country in the men's javelin throw at the 1968 Summer Olympics, as well as the men's javelin throw at the 1964 Summer Olympics. His distance was a 73.45 in the qualifiers and a 73.11 in the finals in 1964, and an 81.00 in qualifying and an 85.70 in the finals in 1968.

References

1940 births
Living people
People from Vawkavysk District
Polish male javelin throwers
Polish athletics coaches
Olympic athletes of Poland
Athletes (track and field) at the 1964 Summer Olympics
Athletes (track and field) at the 1968 Summer Olympics
Jagiellonia Białystok athletes